Kakuy, also rendered as Kahku or Kaku, may refer to:
 Kakuy-e Olya
 Kakuy-e Sofla